Alliance Française of Madras (French: l'Alliance Française de Madras) is a Franco-Indian non-profit association in Chennai, India, that works to promote the cultural relations between India and France in Tamil Nadu and also with a mission to teach the French language to the people in the region. It was formed in 1953.

History
The city's relations with France date back to the 18th century. In 1948, a French Group, consisting mostly of Indian citizens, was formed to spread the French language and culture. Four years later, on 10 August 1953, the group officially became an Alliance Française, registered under the Indian Societies Act XXI of 1860 against the number 39/1953.

In 1991, the Translation Cell of Alliance Française of Madras was founded.

In December 2022, a new building named "Espace 24" was opened in the premises to house the centre for cultural research and studies. The building has classrooms and event spaces and hosts art and cultural exhibitions.

Institution
Alliance Française of Madras is part of the network of the 14 Alliances Françaises in India, under the jurisdiction of the Embassy of France in New Delhi and of the larger network of Alliances Françaises in 136 countries around the world, which themselves come under the Fondation Alliance Française in Paris.

The Alliance Française of Madras is situated in College Road, Nungambakkam. The building occupies  spread over three floors. There are eight classrooms, an exhibition gallery, a library-cum-multimedia centre, an auditorium and a cafeteria (La Cantine). The library-cum-multimedia centre situated at the entrance covers 130 sq m and was renovated in 2008. It has four rooms. It is open on all days except Sundays. The Edouard Michelin Auditorium, which can accommodate 180 persons, is used for film projections, plays, lectures and discussions.

About 3,000 students enroll at the Alliance Française of Madras every year to learn French.
The Alliance française de Madras is only centre in Tamil Nadu to offer DELF and DALF examinations, as well as French language assessment of CCIP (Chambre de Commerce et d'Industrie de Paris) such as TEF and DFP.

The Alliance Française of Madras also has branches outside Chennai, in Coimbatore and Trichy.

Publication
Prélude (Prelude) is a monthly programme published by the Alliance Française of Madras. It provides information about the cultural events and the language courses scheduled for the next two months. The 16-page newsletter in color is made available only to the members of the Alliance, although it is distributed during events at the Alliance or given to occasional visitors.

References

External links
 Homepage of Alliance Française de Madras
Homepage of Alliance Française in India

Cultural centres in Chennai
Universities and colleges in Chennai
Organisations based in Chennai
1953 establishments in Madras State
Alliance Française
France–India relations
Organizations established in 1953